Dolná Ždaňa is a village and municipality in Žiar nad Hronom District in the Banská Bystrica Region of central Slovakia.

History
In historical records, the village was first mentioned in 1391 (Sdan),  when it belonged to Repište. In the 17th century, it passed to Banská Štiavnica’s Mine Chamber.

Genealogical resources

The records for genealogical research are available at the state archive "Statny Archiv in Banska Bystrica, Slovakia"

 Roman Catholic church records (births/marriages/deaths): 1686-1895 (parish B)
 Lutheran church records (births/marriages/deaths): 1812-1895 (parish B)

See also
 List of municipalities and towns in Slovakia

External links
https://web.archive.org/web/20080111223415/http://www.statistics.sk/mosmis/eng/run.html.  
http://www.e-obce.sk/obec/dolnazdana/dolna-zdana.html
Surnames of living people in Dolna Zdana

Villages and municipalities in Žiar nad Hronom District